Take a Hard Ride is a 1975 Italian-American Spaghetti Western film directed by Anthony Dawson and starring Jim Brown, Lee Van Cleef, Fred Williamson and Jim Kelly. This was the second of three films Brown, Williamson, and Kelly would star in, following Three the Hard Way and preceding One Down, Two to Go.

Pike, a stone-faced cowboy, meets up with Tyree, a dishonest gambler. The duo attempts to transport $86,000 across hundreds of miles of Western wasteland to deliver it to the widow of Pike's former employer.

Co-financed by Italian and American producers, filming took place on location in the Canary Islands.

On June 21, 2011, the film was released on DVD through Shout! Factory as part of a double feature with Rio Conchos (1964).

Plot
Pike (Jim Brown), the right-hand man of cattle rancher Bob Morgan (Dana Andrews), is entrusted with a mission to deliver $86,000 across the border to the Morgan Ranch in Sonora, Mexico after his boss dies. Pike teams up with dishonest gambler Tyree (Fred Williamson) and they are forced to trust each other while being pursued by various outlaws and gunmen trying to possess the money, including the ruthless bounty hunter Kiefer (Lee Van Cleef) and corrupt sheriff Kane (Barry Sullivan).

Along the way, the duo comes across a prostitute (Catherine Spaak) in need of rescuing and Kashtok (Jim Kelly), a mute Indian scout skilled in martial arts, as well as Chico, an orphan Mexican boy. After numerous gun battles and chases, Pike and Tyree reach the end of the line at an abandoned mine, where they duke it out over the money, yet finally settle and work together after getting word of the approaching gunmen.

They give the money to the boy, then tell Kashtok to give safe passage to Chico and get the money safely to the ranch. Pike and Tyree devise a plan to escape by using explosives to blow up the mine shaft behind them, killing all their pursuers except for Kiefer, who decides to forgo his bounty and let the men continue their quest to reach the ranch.

Cast
 Jim Brown as Pike
 Lee Van Cleef as Kiefer
 Fred Williamson as Tyree
 Catherine Spaak as Catherine
 Jim Kelly as Kashtok
 Dana Andrews as Morgan
 Barry Sullivan as Kane
 Harry Carey, Jr. as Dumper
 Robert Donner as Skave
 Charles McGregor as Cloyd
 Leonard Smith as Cangey
 Ronald Howard as Halsey
 Ricardo Palacios as Calvera
 Robin (Baker) Levitt as Chico
 Buddy Joe Hooker as Angel

References

External links 
 
 
 
 

Spaghetti Western films
1975 films
African-American Western (genre) films
Films directed by Antonio Margheriti
Films shot in the Canary Islands
1975 Western (genre) films
Films scored by Jerry Goldsmith
English-language Italian films
1970s English-language films
1970s American films
1970s Italian films